Sphingonotus caerulans is a species belonging to the family Acrididae  subfamily Oedipodinae.The northern limit is northern France, eastern Sweden and southern Finland. In Central and Northern Europe the species is restricted to low-vegetation special habitats, in which the soil remains free of vegetation through constant rearrangement (pioneer species of open habitats).it is very common especially in rocky heaths in the Mediterranean area.

References

Orthoptera of Europe
Oedipodinae